Tomuleşti may refer to several villages in Romania:

 Tomuleşti, a village in Poienarii de Argeș Commune, Argeș County
 Tomuleşti, a village in Toporu Commune, Giurgiu County

See also 
 Toma (name)
 Tomești (disambiguation)